Ziguy Badibanga (born 26 November 1991) is a Belgian professional footballer who plays as a winger for Chornomorets Odesa.

Career

Club
Badibanga was born in Evere, Belgium of Congolese descent. He began his career in 2009 at Belgian giants Anderlecht and spent two and a half years at the club where he scored 2 league goals in 19 league games. He decided in January 2012 to accept a half year loan offer abroad in Doetinchem, Netherlands to play for De Graafschap, where he failed to score in 18 league games. Returning to Anderlecht in the summer of 2012, he did not get a starting place at the club for the 2012–13 season. Anderlecht put him on loan once again, this time to Charleroi, where he played 23 league games and scored 3 goals. At the end of the season he returned to Anderlecht and the club were preparing to use him as a starting player but his impressive year at Charleroi attracted offers from clubs around Europe. In the summer of 2013, he accepted an offer to move abroad to Heraklion, Crete, Greece to sign for Ergotelis. In 2013–14, he played 29 league games and scored 6 league goals. In the summer of 2015, Ziguy accepted an offer to move to Tripoli to sign with other Greek club Asteras Tripoli. During his one year in Arcadia he played 14 league games and scored no goals. In the summer of 2015, Badibanga accepted an offer to go to Nicosia, Cyprus to play for Omonia.

On 3 April 2019, Badibanga left Sheriff Tiraspol by mutual termination of his contract.

In April 2019, Badibanga signed a two-year contract with FC Ordabasy.

On 11 April 2021, Badibanga signed for FC Shakhter Karagandy.

International
As a native of Belgium, Badibanga is eligible to represent Belgium, while through his Congolese heritage he is also eligible to represent DR Congo in International football. Badibanga has appeared for Belgium at youth level as he has played with the Belgium U19 and Belgium U21 teams from 2009 to 2010 and from 2010 to 2012 respectively.

References

External links
 
 Profile by UEFA
 

1991 births
Living people
People from Evere
Belgian footballers
Belgian sportspeople of Democratic Republic of the Congo descent
Belgium youth international footballers
Belgium under-21 international footballers
Belgian expatriate footballers
R.S.C. Anderlecht players
Ergotelis F.C. players
De Graafschap players
R. Charleroi S.C. players
Asteras Tripolis F.C. players
AC Omonia players
FC Sheriff Tiraspol players
FC Ordabasy players
FC Chornomorets Odesa players
Belgian Pro League players
Eredivisie players
Super League Greece players
Cypriot First Division players
Moldovan Super Liga players
Kazakhstan Premier League players
Ukrainian Premier League players
Expatriate footballers in the Netherlands
Expatriate footballers in Greece
Expatriate footballers in Cyprus
Expatriate footballers in Moldova
Expatriate footballers in Kazakhstan
Expatriate footballers in Ukraine
Belgian expatriate sportspeople in the Netherlands
Belgian expatriate sportspeople in Greece
Belgian expatriate sportspeople in Cyprus
Belgian expatriate sportspeople in Moldova
Belgian expatriate sportspeople in Kazakhstan
Belgian expatriate sportspeople in Ukraine
Association football wingers
Footballers from Brussels